The Romania national rugby union team represents Romania in men's international rugby union competitions, nicknamed Stejarii (The Oaks), is long considered one of the stronger European teams outside the Six Nations. They have participated in all but one Rugby World Cup and currently compete in the first division of the European Nations Cup, which they won recently in 2017. Rugby union in Romania is administered by the Romanian Rugby Federation.

France first played rugby against Romania in 1924 when they tried to establish a rival to the Five Nations championship. Romania holds with 25 matches the record for the longest unbeaten run. Although not regarded as a first-tier team in more recent times, their history includes an away draw against Ireland, and wins against four (France, Italy, Scotland, Wales) of the other Six Nations Championship teams.

Romania played in every Rugby World Cup through to 2015, but were disqualified from the 2019 Rugby World Cup after fielding an ineligible player during the qualification process.

History

Early history
 
The game itself was introduced by students returning with rugby balls from their studies in Paris to form clubs such as Stadiul Roman from 1913 onwards. Seventeen other teams would be formed in the capital, Bucharest.

Romania's first international was played against the US in 1919. France first officially played rugby union against Romania in May 1924 when they tried to establish a rival to the Five Nations Championship (now the Six Nations). France were victorious by 59 points to 3.

Romania were one of three teams who entered the 1924 Olympics in Paris. France won 59–3, scoring 13 tries including four by the fine Stade Francais winger Adolphe Jaureguy. The United States then defeated Romania 39–0. Romania finishing third claimed the bronze medal. The Federaţia Română de Rugby was formed in 1931. In 1939 a team was formed in Braşov at an aircraft factory. This was the first team outside Bucharest.

Post-World War II

 

The communist regime used rugby union like it used other sports, as a propaganda tool during the Cold War with the West. Every international success was presented as a direct result of the righteousness of the communist rule and ideology. Top players were employed in the army or the police sporting clubs, like CSA Steaua București or Dynamo.

A generation of French school trained coaches  from late 1940s, and 1950s built a system and led the national team to success of the 1960s, 1970s and early 1980s. In this era Romania began to compete more regularly against the major nations. Their first win over France came in 1960 in Bucharest, in a tour match won by 11–5. In 1974 Romania won against France 15–10 in Bucharest,  and the FIRA – Association of European Rugby championship. In 1975 Romania went for an 8-game tour to New Zealand, concluding in Wellington with a 10–10 draw against the Junior All Blacks. Exposure to international rugby developed the country's game and they began to form their own distinctive style of play, built around strong, bruising packs. That Romania was emerging as a real force on the world stage became clear on their 1979 Romania rugby union tour of Wales at Cardiff Arms Park, in an unofficial, non-cap international. The Oaks led going into the dying minutes, when only a last-gasp drop goal from Gareth Davies gave a narrow 13–12 victory for Wales. The improvement continued in 1980, when Romania crushed the French in a record 15–0 win in Bucharest. A trip to Lansdowne Road in the 1980 Romania rugby union tour of Ireland then yielded a 13–13 draw against Ireland in another unofficial, non-cap match.

In the 1980s the country boasted more than 12,000 players in 110 clubs. Home nations sides began to award international caps for matches against Romania in 1981; Scotland were the first to do so when Romania visited them on their 1981 tour, Scotland winning the international by 12 points to 6. Wales travelled to Bucharest in November 1983 and were totally overwhelmed, falling to a 24–6 defeat. Romania's first win over Scotland came in Bucharest in 1984 and their first away win against Five Nations opposition came in 1988 against Wales; 15–9 at Cardiff Arms Park.

Their national side beat Wales (twice – 1983: 24–6 in Romania, 1988: 15–9 in Wales), Scotland (the 1984 Grand Slam side 28–22 in Romania), France (twice 1980: 15–0 in Romania, 1982: 13–9 in Romania) and drew with Ireland (13–13, in 1980, at Dublin). In 1981, they lost to the All Blacks 14–6 but had two tries disallowed. Many felt it was wrong for the rugby union powers to fail to bring them into top-flight competition. Romania beat Zimbabwe 21–20 in their first ever Rugby World Cup match in 1987 but did not win any other games and failed to progress beyond the group stage.

After the collapse of Communism
However, with the deterioration of the domestic political and economic situation in the country in the 1990s, Romanian rugby union suffered; the two leading rugby union teams – Dinamo Bucharest and Steaua Bucharest, represented the police and the army respectively, so their state funding fell. 

Post-revolution, Romanian rugby union was still alive and kicking. In 1990 they recorded a prestigious  win to date by beating France 12–6 on French soil for the first time. The following year they beat Scotland 18–12. At the 1991 World Cup they beat Fiji 17–15 and as recently as the 1995 World Cup, Romania held the eventual winners South Africa to a highly respectable 21–8.

The professionalism that followed immediately upon the heels of that World Cup was the undoing of the sport in Romania. Approximately 200 Romanian players are thought to be playing in France and Italy. It was not just playing numbers that suffered, but a whole generation of potential referees and administrators was lost to the game. By 1994 Romania's rugby fortunes had declined sharply, when a Welsh team travelled to Bucharest for an uncapped international the visitors came away with a 16–9 win. In 1997 the Romanians toured Wales. They lost 36–21 to Wales A at Pontypridd and 70–21 in a test held in Wrexham. At the 1999 World Cup Romania could again only manage a single win 27–25 against the United States.

The new millennium
 

In 2000, Romania won the first European Nations Cup by a large margin, recording victories in all four matches. By 2001, Romania had been caught by the likes of Georgia who defeated them to take the 2001 European Nations Cup, crowned with a decisive 31–20 win over Romania in Bucharest. The national side lost to England by 134–0 in 2001 and Dinamo Bucharest lost 151–0 to Saracens in the European Rugby Shield. Several French-based players refused to turn up for the England debacle simply because their clubs refused to pay them for the week. Players in that Romanian squad were getting £30 a day in expenses while England's top earners scooped £6,000 for their afternoon's work.

In January 2002, Bernard Charreyre was appointed coach of the national team both supplied by and paid by the French Rugby Federation (FFR). Under Charreyre (known by The Oaks as 'Little Napoleon'), the Oaks' decline has been stopped and the team has started to slowly climb from the basement of international rugby union. With a change of format in the European Nations Cup, Romania started in 2002 trailing Georgia due to the inclusion of 2001 results. The Oaks won all of the remaining five games, including a hard-fought 31–23 victory in Tbilisi to win the tournament. They qualified for the World Cup in 2003, where they beat Namibia and lost to Ireland (45–17), after an honourable display, and then to Australia (90–8) and Argentina (50–3). Charreyre was dismissed after the World Cup as the Romanian Federation was not satisfied by the World Cup performance and decided not to renew his contract. Three other French coaches followed: first, Phillipe Sauton, for a very short period, Robert Antonin as a temporary stand-in and then Daniel Santamans.

In the 2003–2004 European Nations Cup, Portugal were surprise 16–15 winners over Romania in Lisbon and installed themselves on the top of the 2003 table. In the second half of the competition, Romania seemed back on track (36–6 against Portugal in Constanţa), but went down 24–33 to Russia in Krasnodar following allegations of players having been doped. Then Portugal clinched their first title with a last-minute 19–18 win over Russia in Lisbon. In 2004, the Romanians scored a narrow 25–24 victory over Italy, their first victory to date over a Six Nations Championship side.

In 2005 Romania was given 'second tier' status by the IRB and replaced Russia in the Super Powers Cup. The USA beat a Romanian team stripped of their France-based players 23–16 in the third place play-off. The 2005–06 European Nations Cup also served as a qualifying group for the 2007 Rugby World Cup. Romania triumphed despite finishing level on points with Georgia.

Romania qualified for the 2007 Rugby World Cup in France, finishing at the top of their pool during the Round 5 of the European qualifying tournaments. Romania won their first qualifying match on 7 October, defeating Georgia in Bucharest 20–8. Their 43–20 win over Spain in Madrid on 14 October ensured that they qualified directly for the World Cup in 2007. In June 2007, Romania hosted the IRB Nations Cup in Bucuresti. In the 2007 Rugby World Cup finals, Romania won a bonus point in the 18–24 loss to Italy and to win a second game with Portugal by a narrow margin (14–10), but suffered heavy losses to Scotland (42–0) and New Zealand (85–8).

On 21 March 2009, Romania lost 22–21 at home to Portugal, leaving them with an uphill struggle to qualify for the 2011 World Cup – qualification for which is determined by performances in the European Nations Cup in 2009 and 2010. Romania went unbeaten, with a draw at Russia, in the 2010 phase of the European Nations Cup. The Oaks' strong finish put them in third place and the final phase of the European qualification playoffs, in which they easily defeated Ukraine over two legs (94–10 on aggregate) for the European place in the Final Place Playoff for the 2011 Rugby World Cup. Romania emerged as the last qualifier for the 2011 Rugby World Cup in New Zealand by overcoming first Tunisia in a winner-takes-it-all game (56–13) and later Uruguay (60–33 on aggregate). Thus, the Oaks are one of only 12 teams to participate at all World Cups alongside New Zealand, Australia, England, France, Wales, Ireland, Scotland, Italy, Argentina, Canada, and Japan.

In November 2016, Romania achieved home soil wins against the US, Canada and Uruguay.

In 2018, Romania finished top of the Rugby Europe Championship, meaning they qualified for the 2019 Rugby World Cup to be played in Japan in 2019. But after the conclusion of the tournament World Rugby conducted a review of player eligibility and found Romania fielded Sione Faka'osilea, who previously played for the Tonga Sevens team, which made him ineligible to play for Romania in the competition. Romania was stripped of 30 competition points, which placed them third and meant that they failed to qualify for the 2019 Rugby World Cup, with Russia taking their place.

On 29 May 2018, it was confirmed that Romania had appealed the decision. On 6 June, the appeal failed and the decision was upheld, meaning Russia was confirmed as Europe 1 and qualified for the World Cup, whilst Germany advanced to round 6.

Honours
 Rugby union at the Summer Olympics
 Bronze Medal (1): 1924
 Rugby Europe International Championships
 Winner (10): 1968–1969, 1974–1975, 1976–1977, 1980–1981, 1982–1983, 2000, 2001–2002, 2004–2006, 2010, 2017
  Runners-Up (14)
  Third-Place (12)
 Antim Cup
 Winner (6): 2002, 2003, 2004, 2006, 2010, 2017
 World Rugby Nations Cup
  Winner (4): 2012, 2013, 2015, 2016

Record
Romania holds the record for the longest unbeaten run: 25 matches in between May 1959 and November 1964.

Wins against Tier 1 nations

European competitions
Romania's only annual tournament is a competition involving Europe's tier 2 and tier 3 national teams. From 1936 through 1938, they competed in the FIRA Tournament against France, Germany and Italy. In 1965 until 1973 the FIRA Nations Cup was formed allowing other teams to be promoted or relegated from the competition. Romania won the competition once in 1969, being the only team to defeat France.

European Nations Cup (2000–present)

Winners

All-time table

Rivalries

Romania and Georgia have enjoyed a rivalry between the two most successful teams in the European Nations Cup. The winner of the rivalry takes home the Antim Cup.

Rugby World Cup

Romania had competed in every Rugby World Cup since the inaugural tournament in 1987; that streak ended in 2018, when they were expelled from the 2019 tournament via points deduction for fielding ineligible players. Their best finish was with one win in 1987, 1991, 1999, 2003, 2007 and 2015. They lost all pool matches in 1995 and 2011.

Overall

Below is a table of the representative rugby matches played by a Romania national XV at test level up until 17 July 2021.

Players

Current squad
On 31 October 2022, Romania named a 33-man squad for the 2022 end-of-year rugby union internationals.

On 8 November 2022, Gheorghe Gajion, Ionuț Mureșan and Fonovai Tangimana were called up to replace Victor Leon, Ștefan Iancu and Ionel Melinte.

Head Coach:  Eugen Apjok
 Caps Updated: 10 November 2022

Notable players

 
 

The 1924 Romania Olympic team are the only Romanian inductee to have been inducted into the IRB Hall of Fame. Nicolae Mărăscu captained the Hall of Fame side. The highest point of Mărăscu's career was at the 1924 tournament, earning Romania the bronze medal. He played as a centre and had five caps, without ever scoring, since his first match, in 1919, a 48–5 loss to France, in Paris, for the Inter-Allied Games, and his last, at 22 May 1927, in a 21–5 win over Czechoslovakia, in Bratislava.

Iulian Dumitraș was Romania's main man. Dumitraș was known to be one of the Oaks' most gifted playmakers, with an accurate kicking boot and a penchant for sparking attacks. Having made his test debut in 2002, he went on to start in every match a Rugby World Cup 2007 in France, bringing plenty of experience to the nation. The then standing 1.88m and weighing in a 110 kg, Dumitraș was a punishing runner when he chimes into the line on attack, which he looked to do often, and he provided a solid and dependable last obstacle in defence.

Sorin Socol is regarded by many good judges as the then best player in the current squad and was one of the rocks of the Romanian forward pack. He has captained the most matches to date for Romania, between 2003 and 2011. A total of 61 tests, 36 of them were as captain. He captained Romania for the first time on 30 October 2003 during the 2003 Rugby World Cup match against Namibia. He went on and featured in the 2007 World Cup squad and eventually retired from all international rugby after the 2011 tournament. Socol had one of Romania's highest winning percentage as a captain of 63.88.

Florin Vlaicu is Romania's top ever point scorer and also the most capped player appearing in 104 tests so far. Vlaicu made his international debut in 2006 as a substitute against Ukraine. He played for Romania in the IRB Nations Cup and in their 2007 Rugby World Cup qualifying before appearing for them in the 2007 Rugby World Cup. He played two Tests at the World Cup as a substitute against both Scotland and the All Blacks. He also played at the 2011 and 2015 Rugby World Cups.

Cristian Petre is Romania's most recognized player after dominating the lock position for eleven years. He is one of Romania's most capped player with a total of 92 matches and a career span that started in 2001 against England and ended in 2012 against Italy. Petre has featured in three Rugby World Cups, first in 2003, going on to feature in 2007 and his last being in 2011. Petre has scored a total of six tries and had winning percentage of 55.43.

Cătălin Fercu is generally regarded as one of Romania's true global superstar of rugby union. Fercu is Romania's top try scorers. He had quickly made appearances on the international stage at a very young age and played against France and Scotland in the Autumn internationals in 2006. He also scored a try against the French. Fercu helped guide Romania to the 2007 Rugby World Cup as he played in the qualifier matches including the vital games against Georgia and Spain and scored a try against Spain in the game that sealed their qualification to the Rugby World Cup. Fercu was a late withdrawal from their Rugby World Cup squad in 2011 because he was not prepared to fly all the way to New Zealand. The Romanian side arrived in Christchurch to prepare for their first game of the tournament against Scotland in Invercargill on 10 September without Fercu, who failed to get on the plane when it left Romania.

Another one of the Oaks greatest players are Romeo Gontineac, represented Romania in four Rugby World Cups from 1995 to 2007. The hard running centre, who became the national coach in 2010, was capped 75 times for the nation, scoring 13 tries and a drop goal. During his career he played professionally in Romania, South Africa and France.

Members of the 1924 Olympics team

Coaches

Current coaching staff
The current coaching staff of the Romanian national team:

Former coaches

Individual all-time records

Most caps

Last updated: Georgia vs Romania, 5 March 2023. Statistics include officially capped matches only.

Most tries

Last updated: Georgia vs Romania, 5 March 2023. Statistics include officially capped matches only.

Most points

Last updated: Georgia vs Romania, 5 March 2023. Statistics include officially capped matches only.

Most matches as captain

Last updated: Georgia vs Romania, 5 March 2023. Statistics include officially capped matches only.

Most points in a match

Last updated: Georgia vs Romania, 5 March 2023. Statistics include officially capped matches only.

Most tries in a match

Last updated: Georgia vs Romania, 5 March 2023. Statistics include officially capped matches only.

Media coverage
Romania's Rugby Europe Championship matches, mid year internationals and end of year internationals are currently televised by TVR.

Kit suppliers

See also
 Rugby union in Romania
 Romanian Rugby Federation
 List of Romania national rugby union players
 Romania national rugby sevens team
 Romania women's national rugby sevens team
 Romania women's national rugby union team
 Romania national under-20 rugby union team
 Sport in Romania

References

Further reading

External links

 Official website 

Romania national rugby union team
Rugby union in Romania
Teams in European Nations Cup (rugby union)
European national rugby union teams